Pogonocherus sieversi is a species of beetle in the family Cerambycidae. It was described by Ganglbauer in 1886. It is known from Georgia, Turkey, Armenia and Ukraine.

References

Pogonocherini
Beetles described in 1886